Spongdal is a village in the municipality of Trondheim in Trøndelag county, Norway. It is the largest village in the Byneset area in Heimdal borough. It is located between the villages of Langørjan and Ringvål.

References

Villages in Trøndelag
Geography of Trondheim